Houttuynia cordata, also known as fish mint, fish leaf, rainbow plant, chameleon plant, heart leaf,  fish wort, or Chinese lizard tail, is one of two species in the genus Houttuynia (the other being H. emeiensis). It is a flowering plant native to Southeast Asia. It grows in moist, shady locations. It was named after Martinus Houttuyn.

Growth
The proximal part of the stem is trailing and produces adventitious roots, while the distal part of the stem grows vertically. It normally blooms in the summer.

It is considered an invasive plant because of its ability to regrow rhizomes from any segment of its foliage.

Cultivation

Houttuynia cordata grows in moist to wet soil or slightly submerged in water, as long as it is exposed partially or fully to the sun. It can become invasive in gardens and difficult to eradicate as their roots run deep and actively spread. It propagates by division.

It is usually found in one of its cultivated forms in temperate gardens. The 'Chameleon' variety (synonymous with H.cordata 'Court Jester',  'Tricolour', and 'Variegata') is slightly less vigorous than the parent species, with stubbier leaves mottled in both yellow and red. Another common variety, 'Flore Pleno', has masses of white bracts and retains the vigor of the parent species.

Houttuynia cordata has been naturalized in North America.

Usage

Culinary use 

It is commonly grown as a leaf vegetable, and is used as a fresh herbal garnish. The leaf has an unusual taste from its volatile oil  (Houttuynine), a taste that is often described as "fishy", earning it the nickname "fish mint".

In northeastern India, the leaves are commonly used in salads, salsas, or cooked with other vegetables, and as a garnish over side dishes. The tender roots can also be ground into chutneys along with dry meat or fish, chilies, and tamarind. It is taken raw as salad and cooked along with fish as fish curry. In Japan and Korea, the dried leaves may be used as an herbal tea, which is believed to have healing properties. It is called dokudami-cha in Japan and eoseongcho cha in Korea.

In Vietnamese cuisine, plant is called diếp cá, and it is used with grilled meat and noodle salad dishes. Fish mint may be used as a garnish with several Vietnamese dishes, such as gỏi cuốn, stir-fried beef with fish mint salad, and bánh xèo.

Zhé'ěrgēn (Chinese: , "broken ear-root") is the edible rhizome of Houttuynia cordata (yúxīngcǎo; ; "fish-smelling grass") with a fresh, spicy, peppery flavour that is used in southwestern Chinese cuisine, i.e. that of Guizhou, Sichuan, Yunnan and western Guangxi. Typically the leaves are eaten in Sichuan and the root in Guizhou.

Notable uses include:
part of the extensive fried rice cuisine of Guizhou
a condiment to migan and mixian noodles when served in broth
as a component of dipping sauces used with the Shiping and Jianshui tradition of barbecued tofu
raw consumption as part of cold-tossed salads, when it is most frequently combined with coriander, vinegar, fresh chilli, and soy sauce.

The leaves are also a little peppery and are frequently consumed in the region.

Traditional medicine 
Houttuynia cordata was used in traditional Chinese medicine, including by Chinese scientists in an attempt to treat SARS and various other disorders, although there is no high-quality clinical research to confirm such uses are safe or effective, as of 2018. When administered via injection, H. cordata can cause severe allergic reactions.

Aroma profile 
Chemical compounds that contribute to the aroma of H. cordata include β-myrcene and 2-undecanone.

See also
Kampo herb list
Sichuan cuisine
Yunnan cuisine

References

External links 

Flora, The Gardener's Bible, ABC Publishing, Ultimo, NSW, Australia, 2006 

Saururaceae
Leaf vegetables
Plants used in traditional Chinese medicine